The McKinstry's Mills Historic District is a national historic district in Union Bridge, located in Carroll and Frederick County, Maryland. The district comprises the entirety of the settlement of McKinstry's Mills, a  hamlet consisting of six separate properties that were owned and developed in the 19th century by the McKinstry family, local millers. At the center is a -story grist mill constructed in 1844. Also included are the McKinstry homestead, built between 1825 and 1835; the residence of miller Samuel McKinstry, dated 1849; a store building of 1850; and two other small houses and a variety of outbuildings. There is also a 1908 Warren pony truss bridge.

It was added to the National Register of Historic Places in 1997.

References

External links
, including 2006 photo, at Maryland Historical Trust
Boundary Map of the McKinstry's Mills Historic District, Carroll County, at Maryland Historical Trust

Historic districts on the National Register of Historic Places in Maryland
Historic districts in Carroll County, Maryland
Historic districts in Frederick County, Maryland
Union Bridge, Maryland
National Register of Historic Places in Carroll County, Maryland
National Register of Historic Places in Frederick County, Maryland